La-Ventura is a female fronted rock/melodic metal band based in the Netherlands. It was founded by ex-Orphanage drummer Erwin Polderman and vocalist Carla van Huizen in 2005. Its sound is characterized by groovy drum beats, raunchy riffs and melodic female vocals.

History

2006-2012
The band terminated their agreement with Razar Ice Records in July 2007 --- just two months before the planned release date for their first album, and continued the production themselves. Their first album, "A New Beginning", debuted on October 6, 2007, and the band signed a record deal with the American-based Renaissance Records in January 2008. The album was officially released in North America on March 18, 2008.

The band has shot the video for their first US single, "Trefoil".

2013-present
A second album, called “White Crow”, has seen the light of days in 2013 with an independent pre-release for the Benelux. Recorded at the MII Recording Studio in France, mixed and produced by Didier Chesneau and mastered by Bruno Gruel at Elektra Mastering. In November 2013, the band officially announced the signing of a license deal with Ravenheart Music Records for the UK/Ireland and Valkyrie Rising for the territories Germany/Austria/Switzerland. A digital release of the single "Song for an Idiot", taken from the album "White Crow", was released on 15 November 2013. In March 2014 the album was officially released in Europe.

On October 31, 2014, an official videoclip of "Song for an Idiot" was released.

On November 7, 2015, the EP 2.0 was released.

At the moment, the band is working on their third studio album, which is to be released somewhere in 2016.

Line-up
Current members
Carla van Huizen - vocals
Sascha "Saz" Kondic - guitar
Michael "Mike" Saffrie - bass
Stefan Simons - drums
Previous members
Marco van Boven - keyboards
Erwin Polderman - drums
Renzo van Poecke - drums

Discography
Studio albums
2007: A New Beginning
2013: White Crow
2016: TBA
EP's & singles
2009: Breaking the Silence (EP)
2013: Song for an Idiot (single)
2015: 2.0 (EP)
Demo's
2006: Trefoil

References

External links
 La-Ventura's Official Website
 La-Ventura on Encyclopaedia Metallum
 La-Ventura on Facebook
 La-Ventura on ReverbNation

Dutch heavy metal musical groups
Dutch gothic metal musical groups
Musical quartets
Musical groups established in 2005
Musical groups from Zeeland
Goes